Cerma cerintha, the tufted bird dropping moth, is an owlet moth of the family Noctuidae. The species was first described by Georg Friedrich Treitschke in 1826.

The MONA or Hodges number for Cerma cerintha is 9062.

References

Further reading

External links

Acronictinae
Articles created by Qbugbot
Moths described in 1826